Jacoona fabronia, the pale grand imperial, is a small butterfly found in India that belongs to the lycaenids or blues family.

See also
List of butterflies of India (Lycaenidae)

References
 
  
 
 
 
 

Butterflies of Asia
Jacoona
Taxa named by William Chapman Hewitson